The CERH Women's Euro 2015 or 2015 CERH Women's Championship was the 13th edition of the CERH European Women's Roller Hockey Championship, held between 25 and 29 August, in Matera, Italy.
The competition was contested by five teams in a Round-robin format.

Standings 

Source: CERH

Games

Day 1

Day 2

Day 3

Day 4

Day 5

Final ranking

References

External links
World's rink-hockey biggest website
Comité Européen de Rink-Hockey CERH website

European Women's Roller Hockey Championship
European Championship
Euro
International roller hockey competitions hosted by Italy
Euro